Hanns-Christian Kaiser (born 26 March 1969) is a German artist.

Early life 

Born in Karlsruhe he was the son of a gallery owner. In his youth he painted with artists such as Herbert Zangs and Professor Walter Becker in Karlsruhe and in Ammersee.

Career
After completing his schooling he worked as a commercial artist in 1987 and since 1989 as a freelance artist in Baden-Baden. He began to exhibit his works in the early 1990s. Kaiser's works can be up to 3 meters height and uniting 4 surfaces that can be of different sizes or origins.

In the year 2005 he represented a synopsis of his art work in Munich. Hanns-Christian Kaiser became a member of the icd-foundation, Stuttgart in 2006.

External links 
 Hanns-Christian Kaiser official Website (English)
 Hanns-Christian Kaiser Biography at WHO’S WHO (German)

1969 births
Living people
20th-century German painters
20th-century German male artists
German male painters
21st-century German painters
21st-century German male artists